Oxyptilus pilosellae (hieracium plume moth) is a moth of the family Pterophoridae first described by Philipp Christoph Zeller in 1841. It is found in most of Europe, east to Russia and Asia Minor. It was released as a biological control agent for Hieracium in New Zealand in 1998.

Description
The wingspan is 15–24 mm. Adults are on wing from May to August in western Europe.

Young larvae feed within the roots of hawkweeds (Hieracium species), including  mouse-ear hawkweed (Hieracium pilosella). Later instars feed on the flowerheads, beneath a silken web.

References

External links
 Hants Moths
 microlepidoptera.nl  

Oxyptilini
Moths described in 1841
Moths of Asia
Plume moths of Europe
Taxa named by Philipp Christoph Zeller
Moths of New Zealand